Redcliffe Tigers AFC is an Australian rules football club that plays its home games in Rothwell, a suburb of Redcliffe, South East Queensland. The team competes in the SEQAFL Div 2 North Australian rules football competition.

It has had a few playing strip changes in the last couple of years, from the Richmond Tiger playing guernsey to an all-black with a tiger head on the front to an all yellow with a tiger head on the front.

The Tigers have teams in under-8.5s, 9.5s, 10.5s, 11.5s, 12.5s, 14.5s, 15.5s girls, 16.5s, 17s girls, Masters, Reserves, Seniors and Women's who after a long hiatus fielded a side in 2019.

History
The club started in 1974 as the Redcliffe Peninsula Australian Football Club, a junior club with underage boys for the local junior competition.

In 1975, the seniors fielded a team in the SQAFA Division 3 and finished in seventh position.
In 1975, the seniors fielded a team in the SQAFA Division 2 and finished in eighth position. A reserve side finished seventh in division 3.

1988 and the club won the SQAFA Division 2 premiership

In 2012, AFL Queensland State Association Division 2 renamed to the South East Queensland Australian Football League (SEQAFL) Division 3.

Premierships
 1988 – Southern Queensland Australian Football Association Division 2
 2002 – AFL Queensland State Association Division 2 - Premiers and champions
 2005 – AFL Queensland State Association Division 1
 2008 – AFL Queensland State Association Division 2
 2012 – AFL Queensland State Association Division 3

References

External links
 

Queensland State Football League clubs
1974 establishments in Australia
Australian rules football clubs established in 1974